The 1946 European Wrestling Championships were held in 20–22 October 1946 Stockholm, Sweden. The competitions were held only in freestyle wrestling.

Medal table

Medal summary

Men's freestyle

References

External links
FILA Database

Wrestling
International sports competitions in Stockholm
1946 in Swedish sport
1946 in European sport
Sports competitions in Stockholm